The Nova Network is a group of five Australian radio stations owned wholly or in part by Nova Entertainment. The Perth station is a joint venture between Nova Entertainment and ARN.

Each station has its own local Breakfast show with daytime, drive and night shifts networked across all stations.

Stations

Network shows 
Nova syndicates a number of programmes across its network.
These include:
 Jamie Row, Weekdays 9am  11am
 Nova Boy's Jams, Weekdays 11am  12pm
 Ben, Liam & Belle's Lunch Break, Weekdays 12pm  1pm
 Mel Tracina, Weekdays 1pm  2pm
 The Chrissie Swan Show, Weekdays 2pm  4pm
 Ricki-Lee, Tim & Joel, Weekdays 4pm  6pm
 Fitzy & Wippa with Kate Ritchie, Weeknights 6pm  7pm
 Smallzy's Surgery, Weeknights 7pm  10pm
 Late Nights with Mason Tucker, Weeknights 10pm  1am
 Ben, Liam & Belle around Australia, 6am  10am (Sunday)
 The Maddy Rowe Aus Music Show, 6pm  7pm (Sunday)

Local announcers
Nova 96.9 – Sydney:

 Fitzy & Wippa with Kate Ritchie, Weekdays 6am  9am
 Jamie Row, Weekdays 9am  11am
 Mel Tracina, Weekdays 1pm  2pm

Nova 100 – Melbourne:
 Ben, Liam & Belle, Weekdays 6am  9am
 Jamie Row, Weekdays 9am  11am
 Mel Tracina, Weekdays 1pm   2pm

Nova 106.9 – Brisbane:
 Ash, Luttsy & Susie, Weekdays 6am  9am
 Maddy Rowe, Weekdays 9am  11am
 Keegan Bakker, Weekdays 1pm  2pm

Nova 91.9 – Adelaide:
 Jodie & Haysey, Weekdays 7am  9am
 Maddy Rowe, Weekdays 9am  11am
 Keegan Bakker, Weekdays 1pm  2pm

Nova 93.7 – Perth:
 Nathan, Nat & Shaun, Weekdays 6am  9am
 Ross Wallman, Weekdays 9am  11am
 Ben Carney, Weekdays 1pm  2pm

Criticism
Nova have received criticism for frequently rotating songs on their playlist. In a piece about the 2020 ARIA Music Awards, NME Australia's Andrew P. Street wrote that the 2004 rollout of Nova FM had "accidentally turned Thirsty Merc and Missy Higgins into stars, before the network swapped to its current format of 14 endlessly repeated songs."

References

External links 
 

 
Daily Mail and General Trust
Nova Entertainment
Australian radio networks
Contemporary hit radio stations in Australia